Brian Lacey is an American entertainment executive best known for being involved in the creation, production, and marketing of original programs for the U.S. and international marketplace.

Active in the entertainment industry for over thirty years, Lacey has distributed and/or produced over 3,200 episodes of television programming to over 100 countries in most all genres, including some of the biggest children's hit series in the past three decades. In 1994, Lacey founded Lacey Entertainment, a New York-based worldwide television marketing, production, and distribution company.

Career

4Kids Entertainment
Lacey's early involvement with 4Kids Entertainment began with a then-little-known children's program, Pokémon. Through Lacey's marketing and global distribution strategies, Pokémon was licensed to every major international broadcast market, becoming the leading kids entertainment brand in the world. This global media platform established by Lacey Entertainment enabled Pokémon to become popular in children's entertainment licensed property over the several decades, generating total revenues in tens of billions of dollars.

Lacey's marketing and distribution relationship with 4Kids Entertainment continued with the Japanese animated action adventure series Yu-Gi-Oh! and the re-launch of the classic kids action series, Teenage Mutant Ninja Turtles (TMNT).

The TMNT global broadcast rollout was designed and executed by Lacey, and within six months from release of the pilot episode of the action series based upon the classic comic book characters, Lacey secured broadcast deals that included major broadcast and pay TV platforms around the world.

Launched in 2001, Yu-gi-oh! soon emerged as the newest older kids entertainment brand around the world, supported by a global broadcast strategy executed by Lacey. Before broadcast in the US, Lacey engineered an arrangement with Nickelodeon worldwide (excluding the US) for the first-ever Japanese animated series to be broadcast on the popular children's network. The Yugioh! franchise (Yugioh!, Yugioh! GX, Yugioh! 5Ds and Yugioh! Zexal and Arc V programs) is now in its 12th consecutive season of broadcast, with over 700 episodes of content.

From mid 2003 through mid 2012, Lacey served as Executive Vice President International for 4Kids Entertainment, managing worldwide TV and video placement of all program content, including Dinosaur King, Kirby, Cubix, One Piece and others, as well as assisting in structuring co-production arrangements, including the colorful Viva Pinata comedy series and the Chaotic action adventure series, executed with YTV and Teletoon Canada respectively, as Canadian co-venture productions.

During the early 2000s, Lacey served as executive producer and global distributor of the Japanese anime cult classic, Shin-chan. This slightly off-beat and somewhat controversial kids comedy series enjoyed broadcast success in over 50 countries. Lacey also introduced several European series to American audiences between 1996 and '97, and served as co-executive producer for the classic young children's series The Mr. Men Show.

Over his career Lacey has packaged a number of series for production, including Where in the World is Carmen Sandiego? (Marina Productions and France Television), and most recently the fast-paced comedy series Rocket Monkeys with Breakthrough Entertainment of Canada.

America's Dumbest Criminals
In 1996, Lacey introduced worldwide the light entertainment series America's Dumbest Criminals. His distribution and production financing strategies helped launch the series in U.S. first-run syndication and worldwide (distributed by Worldvision and Paramount). Lacey's global sales enabled the program to have four consecutive seasons in U.S. syndication and resulted in broadcast in over 60 countries. Lacey Entertainment acquired worldwide rights to the America’s Dumbest Criminals copyright and trademark, which includes the existing 104 half-hour library, as well as publishing rights to the popular book series, a New York Times bestseller.

Zodiac Entertainment
Prior to Lacey Entertainment, he was co-founder (with Peter Keefe) and principal of Zodiac Entertainment, a television program and marketing co-venture formed with Central Independent Television of the UK. Between 1989 and 1994, Zodiac produced, distributed and marketed worldwide a variety of successful children's animated TV series. The first Zodiac original series, Widget, emerged as a multi award-winning contemporary children's classic, and was broadcast in over 115 countries. Additional Zodiac signature series included a comedy-adventure series entitled The Mr. Bogus Show, and the positive educational series, Twinkle the Dream Being.

As principal of Zodiac, Lacey engineered all international television and home video marketing and sales activities and spearheaded the successful US syndication of the company's three properties. Zodiac's programs became an entertainment staple for children throughout the world, including major Pay TV services, network, cable and satellite broadcasters. Lacey also managed Zodiac's merchandise and licensing programs, generating over 250 licensed products, including books, videos, toys, apparel, games, promotions and events worldwide.

Early entertainment career
His television career began in the mid-1980s when he served as vice president and general manager of World Events Productions. During his tenure with World Events, Lacey helped launch worldwide the action-adventure kids animated series Voltron: Defender of the Universe, which became one of the most successful merchandise licensed properties of the decade. Voltron remains a popular character in the children's entertainment industry. Working closely with Peter Keefe, the creative force behind the Voltron phenomenon, the next US syndicated hit to be launched was Denver the Last Dinosaur, an entirely original fresh comedy series. The series was seen in more than 90 countries around the world and is widely considered the first French-American co-production series to enjoy worldwide success, a co-production arrangement engineered by Lacey.

Background

Lacey is a summa cum laude graduate of Saint Michael's College in Vermont, where he was recognized as a Rhodes Scholar finalist in the New England region. He earned his graduate degree in English from Clark University in Massachusetts as a Jonas Clark Scholar.

Active in civic, cultural and philanthropic affairs, Lacey is founder of the Kilkea Foundation, a non-profit foundation that encourages and honors excellence in the humanities, arts and sciences through college scholarship programs in the name of his parents Elizabeth and Howard Lacey, the Henry G. Fairbanks Visiting Humanities Scholar in Residence faculty position at St. Michael's College in Vermont, as well as international fellowships in the humanities and social justice.

Lacey was awarded a Doctor of Humane Letters, honoris causa by St. Michael's College.

References

External links
 Lacey Entertainment

Living people
American businesspeople
Clark University alumni
Saint Michael's College alumni
Year of birth missing (living people)
Place of birth missing (living people)